Sedulothrips is a genus of thrips in the family Phlaeothripidae.

Species
 Sedulothrips tristis
 Sedulothrips vigilans

References

Phlaeothripidae
Thrips
Thrips genera